"It's On You" was a European Hip House dance hit released in 1989 by the Germany-based dance project M.C. Sar & The Real McCoy.

Background 
"It's On You" was the second single released by M.C. Sar & The Real McCoy under ZYX records. The single debuted in 1989 after the first single, "Pump Up The Jam - Rap" (a cover version of the debut Technotronic hit) had reached No.16 in Germany in 1989.  German producers Juergen Wind (J. Wind) and Frank Hassas (Quickmix) wrote and produced the single while German rapper Olaf Jeglitza provided the rap verses.  The new single became a top hit in Germany and a success in other European territories in 1989. The single was particularly successful in France where it had earned silver status where it sold over 200,000 units. The growing success of both singles motivated ZYX Records to request a live act and a music video for the single.   A Frenchman of African descent named George Shampro Mario was hired to be M.C. Sar and to act as a frontman and rapper in order to give a face to the act.  Unbeknownst to the public, Mario was a lip-sync artist who mimed the rap vocals of Jeglitza for the live performances and the music video. During this early phase of the project, Jeglitza was completely anonymous. Singer Patricia Petersen (Patsy) sang the choruses on the single and fronted the project with Mario.

Track listings

Credits
 Vocals by Patricia "Patzy" Peterson
 Backing vocals by Quickmix and Sarah
 Guitar by Jürgen Wind
 Mixed by Freshline Allstars
 Produced by Jay Rapper and Quickmix
 Recorded & mixed at Quadriga Studios / Wind B.C.
 "UK remix" remixed by Adam Fenton and Mick Evans
 "Re-remix" and "7" re-remix" remixed by Mario Aldini

Charts and sales

Weekly charts

Year-end charts

Certifications

Real McCoy version (1999)

"It's On You" was re-recorded by Real McCoy in 1999 as an updated version of the project's original 1990 hit. This version has minor edits to its rap lyrics, and the female vocals were completely re-recorded by singers Ginger and Gabrielle, and the raps were re-recorded with Olaf Jeglitza. A new music video was filmed in a beach/waterfront-like setting and featured rapper Jason Ammon in the video with a cameo appearance by Jeglitza.

Track listings

Credits
 Olaf "O-Jay" Jeglitza - lead vocal/producer
 Ginger Kamphuis - performer
 Gabriele "Geby" Koopmans - vocal
 Jason Ammon - male vocal

Charts

References

1990 singles
Real McCoy (band) songs
Hip house songs
1990 songs
ZYX Music singles
Hansa Records singles